You & Me & Infinity is an EP by synthpop/darkwave band Cold Cave, released on April 27, 2018 by Heartworm Press.

Track listing

Personnel 
Adapted from the You & Me & Infinity liner notes.

Cold Cave
 Wesley Eisold – instruments

Production and design
 Chris Coady – mixing
 Amy Lee – design
 Travis Shinn – photography
 Bob Weston – mastering

Release history

References

External links 
 
 You & Me & Infinity at Bandcamp
 You & Me & Infinity at iTunes

2018 EPs
Cold Cave albums